Amanita aliena is a fungus belonging to the genus Amanita and the subgenus of the same name. Its name comes from the Latin word "aliena" which stands for "foreign". It grows in isolation on soil and is in association with Eucalyptus trees. Its distribution is said to span south Brazil from the States of Rio Grande do Sul to Santa Catarina. The first specimen was discovered in 2008 but it was not published until 2016.

See also 
 List of Amanita species

References

External links 

aliena
Fungi of Brazil
Fungi described in 2016